Eye black is a grease or strip applied under the eyes to reduce glare, although studies have not conclusively proven its effectiveness. It is often used by American football, baseball, softball, and lacrosse players to mitigate the effects of bright sunlight or stadium floodlights. 

The wearing of eye black almost uniquely by American sports players appears to have more to do with aesthetics as Paul Lukas, former writer for ESPN.com has written, "...let's be honest: glare, shmare. The real reason everyone loves to wear eye black is that it looks totally cool, like modern war paint..."

History
One of the earliest known instances of a player wearing eye black is baseball legend Babe Ruth, who, in or around the 1930s, used the grease in an attempt to reduce sun glare. According to Paul Lukas of ESPN.com, eye black caught on with American football player Andy Farkas. He also states that the original eye black was made from the ashes of burned cork.

2003 study
A 2003 study by Brian DeBroff and Patricia Pahk tested whether black eye grease actually had anti-glare properties.  The subjects of the study were divided into three groups: wearers of eye black, wearers of anti-glare stickers, and wearers of petroleum jelly. The subjects' vision was tested using an eye chart while being exposed to natural sunlight.

The study concluded that eye black reduced glare of the sun and improved contrast sensitivity, whereas commercial anti-glare stickers and petroleum jelly (the control substance) were found to be ineffective.

However, the study was subject to unavoidable demand bias, wherein the test subjects could have unconsciously changed their responses during testing based on the fact that they knew which substance they were wearing. Also, the petroleum jelly could have introduced glare that would not occur on natural skin and the study did not test a control condition of natural skin. Learning bias is also a factor in the results due to chart repetition.

New Hampshire study
A study by Benjamin R. Powers at University of New Hampshire, which improved on DeBroff's methodology, found eye black to reduce glare from the sun in women and in those whose eye-color was not blue. The study also tested males and blue-eyed subjects. However, the results were not statistically significant (probably due to a smaller sample size of those test subjects). Some testing was also performed indoors under artificial lighting (when inclement weather prohibited outdoor testing). However, those results showed little difference and were not statistically significant. The Powers study was not a double-blind study because those in contact with the test subjects knew which substance was applied. Also, the eye tests were performed at a distance of only .

MythBusters test
On an episode of MythBusters, Adam Savage and Jamie Hyneman tested whether eye black reduces glare. They determined that, while eye black does not eliminate glare, it does improve an athlete's ability to differentiate between light and dark, enhancing a player's ability to track moving objects in a sunny environment.

Messages in eye black

Some athletes, particularly at the college level, began a practice of writing short messages on their adhesive eye black stickers. The trend gained traction among football players in the mid-2000s, popularized by Reggie Bush, who featured homages to his hometown; other popular messages included Bible verses, memorial tributes, and licensed university logos. The displays began to garner widespread media attention surrounding Tim Tebow, who used Bible verse references. This practice was banned on April 14, 2010, when the NCAA Playing Rules Oversight Panel (PROP) approved a proposal effecting "that players are not allowed to have any symbols or messages on their eye black starting in the 2010 season."

References

External links
The Power of Darkness | Popular Science
Eye Black Used to Cut Glare, or Turn Up Spotlight - New York Times

Cosmetics
Ophthalmology
Sports equipment